Eurema celebensis is a small butterfly of the family Pieridae. It is found in the Sula Islands Regency, Indonesia, on the islands of Sulawesi and Sula. It was first described by Alfred Russel Wallace and named Terias celebensis.

Description 

Wallace originally described the species as follows:

References

celebensis
Butterflies described in 1867
Taxa named by Alfred Russel Wallace